Layal (plural of Layl or plural of the name of Leila) is an Arabic feminine given name, meaning Nights.

Notable people with given name
 Layal Abboud: (15 May 1982) Lebanese singer. 
 Layal Najib: (?–2006)  Lebanese photojournalist
 Layal Watfeh: (February 14, 1980) Syrian composer, musician, and voice actor.

See also
 Leila (name)

References

Arabic feminine given names